The 1995–96 Czech Extraliga season was the third season of the Czech Extraliga since its creation after the breakup of Czechoslovakia and the Czechoslovak First Ice Hockey League in 1993.

Standings

Playoffs

First round
 AC ZPS Zlín - HC Železárny Třinec 4:1 (1:1,1:0,2:0)
 AC ZPS Zlín - HC Železárny Třinec 6:3 (4:2,2:1,0:0)
 HC Železárny Třinec - AC ZPS Zlín 2:3 (1:0,0:3,1:0)
 HC Slavia Praha - HC ZKZ Plzeň 4:2 (1:1,1:0,2:1)
 HC Slavia Praha - HC ZKZ Plzeň 7:2 (3:1,2:1,2:0)
 HC ZKZ Plzeň - HC Slavia Praha 3:5 (0:1,2:3,1:1)
 HC Olomouc - HC Dukla Jihlava 2:5 (0:0,1:3,1:2)
 HC Olomouc - HC Dukla Jihlava 5:3 (2:0,2:1,1:2)
 HC Dukla Jihlava - HC Olomouc 3:1 (2:0,1:0,0:1)
 HC Dukla Jihlava - HC Olomouc 5:3 (0:1,3:2,2:0)
 HC Poldi Kladno - HC Vítkovice 4:2 (2:0,0:1,2:1)
 HC Poldi Kladno - HC Vítkovice 4:3 SN (2:0,0:1,1:2,0:0)
 HC Vítkovice - HC Poldi Kladno 4:0 (2:0,0:0,2:0)
 HC Vítkovice - HC Poldi Kladno 2:3 (1:1,1:2,0:0)

Quarterfinal
 HC Sparta Praha - HC Dukla Jihlava 2:1 (1:0,1:1,0:0)
 HC Sparta Praha - HC Dukla Jihlava 6:2 (2:0,3:2,1:0)
 HC Dukla Jihlava - HC Sparta Praha 2:5 (1:1,0:3,1:1)
 HC Dukla Jihlava - HC Sparta Praha 4:5 PP (2:3,2:0,0:1,0:1)
 HC Chemopetrol Litvínov - AC ZPS Zlín 6:3 (1:0,3:0,2:3)
 HC Chemopetrol Litvínov - AC ZPS Zlín 2:3 PP (1:0,1:1,0:1,0:1)
 AC ZPS Zlín - HC Chemopetrol Litvínov 2:3 SN (1:0,1:1,0:1,0:0)
 AC ZPS Zlín - HC Chemopetrol Litvínov 2:3 (1:1,0:2,1:0)
 HC Chemopetrol Litvínov - AC ZPS Zlín 3:2 (0:1,1:1,2:0)
 HC Petra Vsetín - HC Poldi Kladno 3:0 (0:0,1:0,2:0)
 HC Petra Vsetín - HC Poldi Kladno 4:3 PP (0:0,2:1,1:2,1:0)
 HC Poldi Kladno - HC Petra Vsetín 2:4 (1:1,0:1,1:2)
 HC Poldi Kladno - HC Petra Vsetín 1:2 (0:1,1:0,0:1)
 HC České Budějovice - HC Slavia Praha 5:3 (1:0,2:0,2:3)
 HC České Budějovice - HC Slavia Praha 3:2 (3:1,0:1,0:0)
 HC Slavia Praha - HC České Budějovice 3:4 (1:0,0:3,2:1)
 HC Slavia Praha - HC České Budějovice 1:5 (0:1,0:2,1:2)

Semifinal
 HC Sparta Praha - HC Chemopetrol Litvínov 4:1 (1:1,2:0,1:0)
 HC Sparta Praha - HC Chemopetrol Litvínov 4:6 (1:1,0:3,3:2)
 HC Chemopetrol Litvínov - HC Sparta Praha 4:1 (2:1,1:0,1:0)
 HC Chemopetrol Litvínov - HC Sparta Praha 0:5 (0:2,0:0,0:3)
 HC Sparta Praha - HC Chemopetrol Litvínov 1:6 (0:2,0:1,1:3)
 HC Chemopetrol Litvínov - HC Sparta Praha 5:4 SN (1:1,2:2,1:1,0:0)
 HC Petra Vsetín - HC České Budějovice 4:0 (1:0,1:0,2:0)
 HC Petra Vsetín - HC České Budějovice 5:2 (2:1,1:1,2:0)
 HC České Budějovice - HC Petra Vsetín 2:3 (1:1,1:1,0:1)
 HC České Budějovice - HC Petra Vsetín 1:4 (0:1,1:2,0:1)

3rd place
 HC České Budějovice - HC Sparta Praha 2:5 (1:3,0:1,1:1)
 HC Sparta Praha - HC České Budějovice 3:2 (1:0,1:2,1:0)

Final
HC Vsetin - HC Litvinov 1-2, 8-1, 6-1, 4-1, 2-1

HC Vsetin is 1995-96 Czech champion.

Relegation

References

External links 
 

Czech Extraliga seasons
1995–96 in Czech ice hockey
Czech